Clinton Rutherford "Cupe" Black, Jr. (October 3, 1894 – October 8, 1963) was an American football player.

Black enrolled at Yale University and, while there, played on the Yale Bulldogs football team. He was captain of the 1916 Yale Bulldogs  and a consensus first-team choice for the 1916 College Football All-America Team. He wore #1 that year, the first time Yale donned numbers.  In 1920 Black was rumoured to restart the Massillon Tigers pro football team, and enter the team in the newly formed American Professional Football Association (later renamed the National Football League in 1922), however he later turned down the offer.

World War I
While the Lincoln sank, Black made it into a lifeboat. Soon the U-boat surfaced and circled the life rafts. The sub's captain claimed to be a Yale alumnus who recognized Black and spoke with him. The sub later left the men to their lifeboats. A previous report of the incident had the captain as a Harvard graduate, who took Black on board and set the sub's course for Germany.

After the war, he became a member of the Chicago Board of Trade and thereafter went into the insurance business.  He was the founder, chairman, and chief executive officer of C. R. Black Jr. Corporation, an insurance brokerage business in New York City.  He was married and had two sons and a daughter.  He died in 1963, aged 78 at St. Luke's Hospital in Manhattan.

References

1894 births
1963 deaths
American football guards
Yale Bulldogs football players
All-American college football players
Players of American football from New York City